Angelina Anne Ramsey-Mobley (March 27, 1929 – August 11, 1988) was an American actress. She was best known for her film roles as Mama Fratelli in The Goonies (1985) and as Mrs. Lift in Throw Momma from the Train (1987), the latter of which earned her nominations for an Academy Award and a Golden Globe Award.

Early life
Ramsey was born in Omaha, Nebraska, the daughter of Eleanor (née Smith), the former national treasurer of the Girl Scouts of the USA, and Nathan Mobley, an insurance executive. Her mother was a descendant of the Pilgrims (William Brewster), and her uncle was U.S. Ambassador David S. Smith. Ramsey was raised in Great Neck, New York and Greenwich, Connecticut. She attended Bennington College where she became interested in theatre. She performed in several Broadway productions in the 1950s and married actor Logan Ramsey in 1954. They moved to Philadelphia where they formed the Theatre of the Living Arts.

Career
In the 1970s, Ramsey began a successful Hollywood career in character roles and appeared in such television programs as Little House on the Prairie, Wonder Woman, Three's Company and Ironside. She appeared with her husband in seven films, including her first, The Sporting Club (1971), and her last, Meet the Hollowheads (1989). In 1988, Ramsey was nominated for the Academy Award for Best Supporting Actress and the Golden Globe Award for Best Supporting Actress – Motion Picture for her performance in Throw Momma from the Train (1987), with Billy Crystal and Danny DeVito. The film also earned her a second Saturn Award for Best Supporting Actress; she had received her first for The Goonies (1985). In February 1988, she guest-starred on an episode of ALF that aired six months before her death. She also appeared in six films released in the two years after her death.

Death
Ramsey's somewhat slurred speech, a trademark of her later performances, was caused in part from having had some of her tongue and her jaw removed during surgery for esophageal cancer in 1984. In 1988, Ramsey's cancer returned. She died in August at the Motion Picture & Television Country House and Hospital in Woodland Hills, California. Ramsey is buried at Forest Lawn Cemetery in North Omaha, Nebraska.

Filmography

Film

Television

References

External links
 
 
 
 

1929 births
1988 deaths
20th-century American actresses
Actresses from Nebraska
Actresses from Omaha, Nebraska
American film actresses
American people of English descent
American stage actresses
American television actresses
Bennington College alumni
Burials in Nebraska
Deaths from cancer in California
Deaths from esophageal cancer